Kyazanga is a town council in the Lwengo District of the Central Region of  Uganda.

Location
The coordinates of the town are 0°23'11.0"S, 31°19'07.0"E (Latitude:-0.386389; Longitude:31.318611).

Climate
The Köppen-Geiger climate classification system classifies its climate as tropical wet and dry (As).

Population
The 2014 national population census put he population of Kyazanga at 15,531.

Points of interest
The following additional points of interest lie within the town limits or near its edges:
 offices of Kyazanga Town Council
 Kyazanga central market
 Masaka-Mbarara Highway, passing through the center of the town, in an east to west direction.

See also

 Lwengo
 Districts of Uganda
 List of cities and towns in Uganda

References

External links
Kyazanga Struggles To Provide Social Services

Lwengo District
Populated places in Central Region, Uganda
Cities in the Great Rift Valley